The European Men's and Women's Team Badminton Championships is a tournament organized by the Badminton Europe (BE), held once every two years to crown the best badminton men's and women's national teams in Europe.

Hosts

Medalists

Medal table

References

External links
 European Men's & Women's Team Championships

 
International badminton competitions
2006 establishments in Europe
Recurring sporting events established in 2006